Gregorio García Segura (1929–2003) was a Spanish composer of film scores.

Selected filmography
 The Showgirl (1960)
 Darling (1961)
 The Lovely Lola (1962)
 The Son of Captain Blood (1962)
 The Woman from Beirut (1965)
 The Drums of Tabu (1966)
 Seven Vengeful Women (1966)
 Great Friends (1967)
 The Rebellious Novice (1971)
 Variety (1971)
 The Girl from the Red Cabaret (1973)
 Forget the Drums (1975)
 Death's Newlyweds (1975)
 The Legion Like Women (1976)
 And in the Third Year, He Rose Again (1980)
 Spoiled Children (1980)
 All Is Possible in Granada (1982)
 Black Venus (1983)

References

Bibliography
 Thomas Weisser. Spaghetti Westerns: the Good, the Bad and the Violent. McFarland, 2005.

External links

1929 births
2003 deaths
Spanish film score composers
Male film score composers
People from Cartagena, Spain
20th-century Spanish musicians
20th-century Spanish male musicians